This article contains information about the literary events and publications of 2020.

Events
 April 14 – Bookshops are among the first few premises permitted to reopen on relaxation of restrictions arising from the COVID-19 pandemic in Italy.
 May 26–July 10 – J. K. Rowling releases her new fairy tale The Ickabog in free online instalments during restrictions arising from the COVID-19 pandemic in the United Kingdom.
 June 25 – Louisa May Alcott's unfinished "Aunt Nellie's Story" (c.1849) is first published, in The Strand Magazine.
 July 31 – 2020 Booker Prize longlisted (later shortlisted) author Tsitsi Dangarembga is arrested in Zimbabwe as part of a government crackdown ahead of anti-corruption protests.
 August – The Herzog August Library in Wolfenbüttel, Germany, purchases Das Große Stammbuch, an album amicorum compiled by diplomat Philipp Hainhofer, which the library's patron Augustus the Younger, Duke of Brunswick-Lüneburg, tried but failed to acquire following Hainhofer's death in 1647.
 October 13 – A first issue first edition of Harry Potter and the Philosopher's Stone sells at auction in the UK for £60,000 and a copy of Isaac Newton's The Mathematical Principles of Natural Philosophy in the 1729 English translation (the second to sell in recent weeks) for £24,000.
 October 14 – A Shakespeare First Folio sells at auction in New York City for $9.98M (£7.6M) (50% more than the previous copy auctioned in 2001).
 November 25 – Penguin Random House agrees to acquire rival publisher Simon & Schuster from ViacomCBS for US$2.175 billion.

New books
Dates after each title indicate the first publication, unless otherwise indicated. 

ISBN in first citation always refers to the first edition published. Links should point to first edition, though they may point to newer editions by the same publisher. If the publisher does not present the first edition online, a second citation is provided with a link to a newer one on the publisher's site.   

OCLC may represent other ISBNs in some cases.

Fiction

Children and young people
 Raymond Antrobus – Can Bears Ski? (November 10, UK)
 Sophie Blackall – If You Come to Earth (September 15)
 Jordan Ifueko – Raybearer (August 8)
 Tae Keller – When You Trap a Tiger
 Jeff Kinney
 Diary of a Wimpy Kid: The Deep End (October 27)
 Rowley Jefferson's Awesome Friendly Adventure (August 4)
 E. Lockhart – Again Again (June 2)
 J. K. Rowling – The Ickabog (November, UK, book publication)
 Trung Le Nguyen – The Magic Fish (graphic novel)
 Jacqueline Wilson – Love Frankie (August 20, UK)

Poetry
 Eavan Boland (died 2020) – The Historians (October 29, UK)
 Lana Del Rey – Violet Bent Backwards over the Grass (September 29)
 Carolyn Forché – In The Lateness of The World: Poems (March 10)
 Srikanth Reddy – Underworld Lit (August 4)

Drama
 Ben Elton – The Upstart Crow
 David Hare – Beat the Devil
 David Williamson – Family Values

Non-fiction
 Craig Brown – One Two Three Four: The Beatles in Time (April 10, UK)
 Emily Levesque – The Last Stargazers: The Enduring Story of Astronomy's Vanishing Explorers
 Dara McAnulty – Diary of a Young Naturalist (May 21, UK)
 James Nestor – Breath: The New Science of a Lost Art (May 26)
 Barack Obama - A Promised Land (November 17, US)
 Camilla Pang – Explaining Humans: What Science Can Teach Us about Life, Love and Relationships (March 12, UK)
 Jay Parini – Borges and Me: An Encounter
 Stuart Ritchie – Science Fictions: How Fraud, Bias, Negligence, and Hype Undermine the Search for Truth (July 21, UK)
 Philip Rucker and Carol Leonnig – A Very Stable Genius: Donald J. Trump's Testing of America
 Peter Sloterdijk – Making the Heavens Speak (Den Himmel zum Sprechen bringen) (October 26, Germany)
 Mary Trump – Too Much and Never Enough: How My Family Created the World's Most Dangerous Man (August 11)
 Debora MacKenzie - COVID-19: The Pandemic that Never Should Have Happened, and How to Stop the Next One (June 30)
 Joseph M. Reagle Jr. and Jackie Koerner - Wikipedia @ 20: Stories of an Incomplete Revolution

Biography and memoirs
 Lee Lawrence –  The Louder I Will Sing (September 17, UK)

Deaths

Awards 
The following list is arranged alphabetically:

Akutagawa Prize: Haneko Takayama, 
Anisfield-Wolf Book Award: Namwali Serpell, The Old Drift
Baillie Gifford Prize:
Booker Prize: Douglas Stuart, Shuggie Bain
Bookseller/Diagram Prize for Oddest Title of the Year: A Dog Pissing at the Edge of a Path: Animal Metaphors in Eastern Indonesian Society by Gregory Forth.
Caine Prize for African Writing: Irenosen Okojie, "Grace Jones"
Camões Prize: 
Carnegie Medal: Anthony McGowan, Lark
Costa Book Awards: Monique Roffey, The Mermaid of Black Conch (novel prize and overall Book of the Year)
Danuta Gleed Literary Award: Zalika Reid-Benta, Frying Plantain
David Cohen Prize: not awarded this year
Desmond Elliott Prize: Derek Owusu, That Reminds Me
Dylan Thomas Prize: Bryan Washington, Lot
Edgar Award
European Book Prize: Pavol Rankov, Stalo sa prvého septembra (alebo inokedy) and Kapka Kassabova, Border: a journey to the edge of Europe
Folio Prize: Valeria Luiselli, Lost Children Archive
German Book Prize: Anne Weber, Annette, ein Heldinnenepos
Goldsmiths Prize: M. John Harrison, The Sunken Land Begins to Rise Again
Gordon Burn Prize: Peter Pomerantsev, This Is Not Propaganda
Governor General's Award for English-language fiction: Michelle Good, Five Little Indians
Governor General's Award for French-language fiction: Sophie Létourneau, Chasse à l'homme
Governor General's Awards, other categories: See 2020 Governor General's Awards
Grand Prix du roman de l'Académie française: Étienne de Montety, La grande épreuve
Hugo Award for Best Novel: Arkady Martine, A Memory Called Empire
International Booker Prize: Marieke Lucas Rijneveld, The Discomfort of Evening translated by Michele Hutchison
International Dublin Literary Award: Anna Burns, Milkman
International Prize for Arabic Fiction: Abdelouahab Aissaoui, The Spartan Court
James Tait Black Memorial Prize for Fiction: 
James Tait Black Memorial Prize for Biography: 
Kerry Group Irish Fiction Award: Edna O'Brien, Girl (Faber and Faber)
Lambda Literary Awards: Multiple categories; see 32nd Lambda Literary Awards.
Legion of Honour, Chevalier: 
Miguel de Cervantes Prize: Francisco Brines
Miles Franklin Award: Tara June Winch, The Yield
National Biography Award:
National Book Award for Fiction: Charles Yu, Interior Chinatown
National Book Critics Circle Award:
Newbery Medal: Jerry Craft, New Kid
Nike Award: Joanna Gierak-Onoszko:	27 śmierci Toby'ego Obeda
Nobel Prize in Literature: Louise Glück
PEN/Faulkner Award for Fiction: Chloe Aridjis, Sea Monsters
PEN Center USA Fiction Award:
Premio Planeta de Novela:
Premio Strega: Sandro Veronesi, Il colibrì
Pritzker Literature Award for Lifetime Achievement in Military Writing: David M. Glantz
Prix Goncourt: Hervé Le Tellier, L'anomalie
Pulitzer Prize for Fiction: Colson Whitehead The Nickel Boys
Pulitzer Prize for Poetry: Jericho Brown The Tradition
Queen's Birthday Honours (UK) 
RBC Taylor Prize: Mark Bourrie, Bush Runner
Rogers Writers' Trust Fiction Prize: Gil Adamson, Ridgerunner
Russian Booker Prize:
SAARC Literary Award: 
Scotiabank Giller Prize: Souvankham Thammavongsa, How to Pronounce Knife
Golden Wreath of Struga Poetry Evenings: Amir Or
Walter Scott Prize: Christine Dwyer Hickey, The Narrow Land
Whiting Awards:
Drama: Will Arbery
Fiction: Andrea Lawlor, Ling Ma, and Genevieve Sly Crane
Nonfiction: Jaquira Díaz and Jia Tolentino
Poetry: Aria Aber, Dianely Antigua, Jake Skeets, and Genya Turovskaya
Women's Prize for Fiction: Maggie O'Farrell, Hamnet
W.Y. Boyd Literary Award for Excellence in Military Fiction: Ralph Peterson, Darkness at Chancellorsville
Zbigniew Herbert International Literary Award: Durs Grünbein

See also

References

 
2020-related lists
Literature
Culture-related timelines by year
Years of the 21st century in literature